Jo Dragotta (born February 11, 1991) is an American professional soccer defender  who formerly played for the Boston Breakers of the National Women's Soccer League (NWSL).  She previously played college soccer for the University of Florida.

Career

Youth and college career
Dragotta was born in Tampa, Florida, where she attended and played for Gaither High School for four seasons. Dragotta was a three-time All-Sunshine Conference and All-Hillsborough County selection. She scored 14 goals as a junior and 10 as a senior at Gaither H.S. Dragotta was coached in High school by former United States women's national soccer team coach George Fotopoulos. Dragotta was also a three-year member of Florida's Olympic Development Program's (ODP) state team. She was invited to the 2007 United Soccer Leagues Super Y-League ODP National camp, appeared on ESPN RISE top players list for Central Florida, was a five-year member of the Hillsborough County United Club Team that won the 2009 Florida Youth Soccer Association State Cup Under-19 championship and advanced to 2009 US Youth Soccer Region III tournament, her team also advanced to the 2008 Florida State U-19 semifinal. She was coached at HC United by Danielle Fotopoulos.

Dragotta attended the University of Florida, where she played for coach Becky Burleigh's Florida Gators women's soccer team in National Collegiate Athletic Association (NCAA) and Southeastern Conference (SEC) competition from 2009 to 2012.  During her four-year college career, she played in 82 games, and started 53 of them, primarily as a midfielder, and was credited with seven goals and 11 assists.  During her time as a Gator, the team won the regular season conference championship in 2009, 2010 and 2012, and the SEC Tournament in 2010 and 2012.  As a senior in 2012, she was a first-team All-SEC selection.  Dragotta graduated from the University of Florida in May 2013, with a bachelor's degree in anthropology.

Professional career
Dragotta was drafted by the Boston Breakers in the 3rd round, 21st overall in the inaugural 2013 National Women's Soccer League draft.

References

External links

 University of Florida player profile
 Boston Breakers player profile
 Profile

1991 births
Living people
American women's soccer players
Boston Breakers players
Florida Gators women's soccer players
National Women's Soccer League players
Boston Breakers draft picks
Women's association football midfielders
Soccer players from Tampa, Florida